Gary William Bull (born 12 June 1966) is an English retired footballer. He played for many clubs, most notably Nottingham Forest, typically as a centre forward.

Playing career
Having been a trainee at Southampton, Bull joined Cambridge United in March 1988.

During the 2006–07 season at Boston Town, he scored 57 goals, a club record. He later went on to become their all-time top scorer with over 200 goals, despite joining the club at the age of 39, before finally retiring from playing aged 45 in 2012.

Personal life
He is the cousin of Steve Bull, the record goalscorer for Wolverhampton Wanderers.

Honours
Individual
PFA Team of the Year: 1991–92 Fourth Division, 1992–93 Third Division

References

External links
Official Boston Town F.C. site

1966 births
Living people
Sportspeople from West Bromwich
English footballers
Association football forwards
Southampton F.C. players
Cambridge United F.C. players
Barnet F.C. players
Nottingham Forest F.C. players
Brighton & Hove Albion F.C. players
Birmingham City F.C. players
York City F.C. players
Scunthorpe United F.C. players
Grantham Town F.C. players
Lincoln United F.C. players
Boston Town F.C. players
English Football League players
Premier League players